Matua is an uninhabited volcanic island near the center of the Kuril Islands chain in the Sea of Okhotsk in the northwest Pacific Ocean,  across Golovnin Strait from Raikoke. Its name is derived from the Ainu language, from “hellmouth”.

History
Hunting and fishing parties of the Ainu have long visited Matua, but the island had no permanent habitation at the time of European contact. It appears on an official map showing the territories of the Matsumae Domain, a feudal domain of Edo period Japan dated 1644, and the Tokugawa shogunate officially confirmed these holdings in 1715.  Some early European documents refer to the island as Raukoke.

The Empire of Russia claimed sovereignty over the island, which initially passed to Russia under the terms of the Treaty of Shimoda (1855), but reverted to the Empire of Japan per the Treaty of Saint Petersburg along with the rest of the Kuril islands. Japan formerly administered Matua as part of Shimushiru District of Nemuro Subprefecture of Hokkaidō.

During World War II the Imperial Japanese Army had a roughly east–west-oriented airfield, which hosted the IJNAS's 553rd Kōkūtai, equipped with Aichi D3A Val dive bombers, located on this island, with the active runway potentially of some 1.33 km (4,360 ft) length, located on its southernmost areas. This airfield was of an advanced design, having three separate airstrips including a tertiary airstrip connected to the other two at a 120° angle. This allowed simultaneous takeoff and recovery of air units, as well as improved takeoff potential in adverse wind conditions. In addition, at least two of the primary airstrips were designed with hot water channels embedded within. In icy or snowy weather, hot water generated by the island's geothermal activity would be pumped through these channels, keeping these airstrips free of ice year-round.

The island was garrisoned by 7000-8000 men of the 41st Independent Mixed Regiment, 6th Independent Tank Company, and supporting units. During 1944 the US Army Air Forces intermittently bombed the Japanese facilities on the island and ships of the United States Navy shelled it. The Americans sank several Japanese cargo vessels near the island or while at harbor. On June 1, 1944, a Japanese shore-battery on Point Tagan sank the American submarine . During the Soviet Battle of the Kuril Islands in the last weeks of World War II, the Japanese garrison surrendered to the Red Army without resistance (August 1945).

After World War II the island came under the control of the Soviet Union, and Soviet Border Troops manned the former Japanese military facilities.  Its most important role was radar surveillance of the Kuril Islands.  A VHF P-14 radar, "Tall King", was put into service during the 1950s or 1960s, and a P-35 radar and possibly a PRV-10 “Rock Cake” radar were also in service at some point.

With the withdrawal of Soviet military forces following the dissolution of the Soviet Union in 1991, the island became uninhabited. The Russian Federation administers it as part of the Sakhalin Oblast. In 2016 some two hundred Russian officials and technical experts made an expedition to the island, part of a plan to rehabilitate the derelict 1.2 km Soviet airfield and establish a new naval and logistical forward military base. A new 1400 meter runway was built between 2016 and 2019, along with new hard stands, both of which are visible on Google Earth and other satellite images. The island now hosts a battery of Bastion anti-ship cruise missiles.

Geology

The island is a complex stratovolcano with two main peaks.

Sarychev Peak (Fuyōzan, also known as Matsuwa-Fuji) in the northwest of the island is one of the most active volcanoes of the Kuril Islands. Lava flows descending on all sides of the peak forms capes along the coast. Eruptions have been recorded since the 1760s, including 1878–1879, 1923, 1930, 1946, 1960, 1976, 1981, 1987, 1989 and 2009, with the largest in 1946 which produced pyroclastic flows that reached the sea. The 2009 eruption was large enough to affect air traffic between Asia and North America.

Climate
Although it is located at the same latitude as Paris or Seattle, the Oyashio current on the western flank of the Aleutian Low gives Matua a subarctic climate (Köppen Dfc) that is close to a polar climate (ET). Unlike the quintessential subarctic climate of Siberia or Mongolia, however, Matua has very heavy precipitation as rain, snow and fog. Seasonal lag, like in all the Kuril Islands, is a major feature of the climate, with August being the mildest month and February the coldest.

See also
List of volcanoes in Russia
Organization of Kita and Minami Fortresses

References

Notes

Further reading 
Gorshkov, G. S. Volcanism and the Upper Mantle Investigations in the Kurile Island Arc. Monographs in geoscience. New York: Plenum Press, 1970. 
Krasheninnikov, Stepan Petrovich, and James Greive. The History of Kamtschatka and the Kurilski Islands, with the Countries Adjacent. Chicago: Quadrangle Books, 1963.
Rees, David. The Soviet Seizure of the Kuriles. New York: Praeger, 1985. 
Takahashi, Hideki, and Masahiro Ōhara. Biodiversity and Biogeography of the Kuril Islands and Sakhalin. Bulletin of the Hokkaido University Museum, no. 2-. Sapporo, Japan: Hokkaido University Museum, 2004.

External links

 
Active volcanoes
Islands of the Sea of Okhotsk
Islands of the Russian Far East
Stratovolcanoes of Russia
Islands of the Kuril Islands
Uninhabited islands of Russia
Volcanoes of the Kuril Islands
Mountains of the Kuril Islands